Bench warmer (or benchwarmer) is a sports player who is not selected to play, hence sits on the benches and keeps them warm. It may also refer to:
The Benchwarmers, 2006 American film
Bench Warmer International, American company that produces trading cards featuring female models

See also
Substitution (sport)

Other terms that use temperature to describe sharing of an item:
Hotdesking
Hot racking